Bertholdia aroana is a moth of the family Erebidae. It was described by Strand in 1919. It is found in Venezuela.

References

Phaegopterina
Moths described in 1919